Willie Mands is a retired Scottish darts player.

Mands played in the 1986 World Professional Darts Championship losing 3–1 in sets to Fred McMullan.  Mands was previously a winner of the Scottish Masters in 1985.

World Championship results

BDO
 1986: Last 32: (lost to Fred McMullan 1–3) (sets)

External links
Profile and stats on Darts Database

Living people
Scottish darts players
Sportspeople from Thurso
British Darts Organisation players
Year of birth missing (living people)